Charleville can refer to:

Australia 

 Charleville, Queensland, a town in Australia
Charleville railway station, Queensland

France 

 Charleville, Marne, a commune in Marne, France
Charleville-Mézières, a commune in Ardennes, France
 Charleville-Mézières station
 Charleville musket, a smoothbore longarm used by the French military in the 18th and early 19th century

Ireland 
Charleville, County Cork, a town in Ireland
Charleville railway station
Charleville GAA
Charleville (Parliament of Ireland constituency)
Charleville Castle, a castle in County Offaly, Ireland
Earl of Charleville, an 18th- and 19th-century Irish peerage

See also
 Charlesville (disambiguation)